Margaret L. Hedstrom, Ph.D., is the Robert M. Warner Collegiate Professor of Information at the University of Michigan School of Information. She has contributed to the field of digital preservation, archives, and electronic records management and holds a doctorate in history from the University of Wisconsin.

Hedstrom has led or participated in many international research projects. Currently, this entails leading the NSF-funded Sustainable Environment through Actionable Data (SEAD) project, which is working closely with sustainability scientists to "develop a system that will allow them to manage and share their data." Additionally, Hedstrom led the CAMiLEON project. This project, which was conducted jointly with the University of Leeds and funded by the National Science Foundation in the US and the Joint Information Systems Committee (JISC) in the UK, investigated the use of emulation tools as part of a strategy for long-term preservation of digital records. Her current research interests include digital preservation strategies and cultural preservation and outreach in developing countries. She has also been a consultant to more than a dozen government archival programs, the World Bank, the International Council on Archives. She has served on doctoral committees at the State University of New York at Albany, the University of Pittsburgh, as well as the University of Michigan.

Biography
Before joining the faculty at Michigan in 1995, she was Chief of State Records Advisory Services and Director of the Center for Electronic Records at the New York State Archives and Records Administration (1985–95). She earned her master's degrees in Library Science (1977) and History (1979) and a Ph.D in History (1988), all from the University of Wisconsin–Madison.

Even prior to her academic career, Dr. Hedstrom conducted research on the management and preservation of electronic records for nearly 20 years beginning at the State Historical Society of Wisconsin (1979–83). She was a principal planner of a major conference on electronic records research held in 1991, which established national priorities for research and development.

She has shaped the research agenda in digital preservation, beginning with her 1991 article "Understanding Electronic Incunabula." The article remains a profound statement of the research challenges posed by the emergence of the digital order. In addressing continuing education needs on electronic records, Hedstrom argued for the importance of ensuring that graduate education emphasized core archival concepts.

She was an author of It's About Time: Research Challenges in Digital Archiving and Long-Term Preservation (2003), sponsored by the Digital Government Research Program and the Digital Libraries Program Directorate for Computing and Information Sciences and Engineering at the National Science Foundation (NSF) and the Library of Congress' National Digital Information Infrastructure and Preservation Program. In 2002-03 she co-chaired the Working Group on Digital Archiving and Preservation, which was sponsored by the National Science Foundation and by the European Union through DELOS Network of Excellence.

She co-authored the report Invest to Save: Report and Recommendations of the NSF-DELOS Working Group on Digital Archiving and Preservation (2003). These agendas attempt to respond to upcoming challenges predicted for the near future.

Awards and honors
Dr. Hedstrom was named as a fellow of the Society of American Archivists in 1992. She was the first recipient of the annual Award for Excellence in New York State Government Information Services. She received the University of Michigan's Distinguished Scholarly Achievement Award for her work at the University of Fort Hare in South Africa. In 2008, the Library of Congress recognized Hedstrom as a "pioneer of digital preservation".

References

External links
 SEAD Project
 Schwarz, John. "In Storing 1’s and 0’s, the Question Is $", New York Times, April 9, 2008

1953 births
Living people
American archivists
Female archivists
Grinnell College alumni
University of Michigan faculty
University of Wisconsin–Madison School of Library and Information Studies alumni
Fellows of the Society of American Archivists
University of Wisconsin–Madison College of Letters and Science alumni